LibX is a platform-independent C++ software library used to provide handling of DirectX .X files. 

It's mainly built of two statically linked libraries and one executable demonstrating the capability to load models and render them using OpenGL. The two libraries are:

libx_core 

This one parses the actual file and generates an in-memory-representation of the file content (similar to a .xml DOM tree.)

libx_model 

This library can convert the generated file-representation into a format suitable for rendering, specifically:

 converting indices to 16bit representation if possible
 reordering streams of normals, positions, etc. so that they are indexable with one index for each vertex
 convert quad-faces to triangles
 etc.

External links 
 Sourceforge's project page
 Project announcement

C++ libraries
Graphics libraries